Moira is a rural community in the central south part of the Riverina and the site of a railway station.  It is situated by road, about 11 kilometres north of Barnes and 15 kilometres south west of Mathoura.

Moira Post Office opened on 16 December 1879 and closed in 1970.

Notes

External links 
 Moira Rail Siding

Towns in the Riverina
Towns in New South Wales
Murray River Council